Holme Lacy railway station is a disused railway station that served the village of Holme Lacy in Herefordshire. One of the original two stations between Hereford and Ross, along with Fawley, Holme Lacy opened with the line on 1 June 1855 it was located on the Great Western Railway line linking Ross-on-Wye and Hereford. The platform remains and the station building has been demolished to foundation level.

References

Further reading

External links
Station site today
Holme Lacy on a navigable 1946 O. S. map

Former Great Western Railway stations
Disused railway stations in Herefordshire
Railway stations in Great Britain opened in 1855
Railway stations in Great Britain closed in 1964
Beeching closures in England